The 2012 Beef 'O' Brady's Bowl, the fifth edition of the game formerly known as the  St. Petersburg Bowl, was a post-season American college football bowl game, held on December 21, 2012 at Tropicana Field in St. Petersburg, Florida, as part of the 2012–13 NCAA Bowl season.

The game, broadcast at 7:30 p.m. ET on ESPN, featured the UCF Knights from Conference USA and Ball State Cardinals from the Mid-American Conference. It was the final game of the 2012 NCAA Division I FBS football season for both teams. The Knights advanced to the game after losing to the Tulsa Golden Hurricane in the Conference USA Championship Game.

Teams
Since the game's inception in 2008, the Beef 'O' Brady's Bowl has had its current setup with a team from Conference USA playing a team from the Big East Conference. Ball State was chosen as a replacement for the potential Big East team, because the conference did not have enough bowl-eligible teams to send a representative to St. Petersburg.

This was the fourth meeting between these two teams. The all-time record is tied 2-2. The last time they played was in 2004, when UCF was with Ball State in the MAC (UCF was a football-only member of the MAC).

UCF

Initially, the Knights were ineligible for the postseason because of recruiting violations in both football and basketball under previous athletic director Keith Tribble. Almost immediately afterwards, the university appealed; because its hearing was delayed until 2013, the Knights were bowl-eligible for 2012.  Finishing as C-USA East Division Champions with a 7–1 conference record, the Knights would go on to the Conference USA Championship Game for the fourth time in eight years. After losing to Tulsa 33–27 in overtime, the Knights advanced to the Beef 'O' Brady's Bowl per the C-USA's bowl contingency plan.

This was the Knights' second Beef 'O' Brady's Bowl, they had previously played in the 2009 game, losing to the Rutgers Scarlet Knights by a score of 45–24. It was also the Knights' final game as a member of Conference USA before they move to the American Athletic Conference in 2013.

Ball State

Ball State entered the game with 9–3 record, losing only to Clemson, Kent State and BCS-buster Northern Illinois. It was the Cardinals first bowl game since the 2009 GMAC Bowl.

Game summary

Scoring summary

Statistics

Source:

References

External links
Box score at ESPN

Beef 'O' Brady's Bowl
Gasparilla Bowl
Ball State Cardinals football bowl games
UCF Knights football bowl games
Beef 'O' Brady's Bowl
21st century in St. Petersburg, Florida